The Journal of Neuroscience Research is a monthly peer-reviewed scientific journal covering all aspects of neuroscience. It was established in 1975 and is published by Wiley-Liss. The editors-in-chief are Cristina A. Ghiani and J. Paula Warrington. The journal publishes full-length papers, reviews, mini-reviews, and commentaries.

According to the Journal Citation Reports, the journal has a 2020 impact factor of 4.164.

Abstracting and indexing 
The journal is abstracted and indexed in:

References

External links 
 

Neuroscience journals
Wiley-Liss academic journals
Publications established in 1975
English-language journals
Monthly journals